The Idaho Court of Appeals is the intermediate-level appellate court for the state of Idaho.  The court was created by statute by the Idaho Legislature and began operations in 1982.

Jurisdiction
The Court of Appeals hears cases assigned to it by the Idaho Supreme Court.  The only exceptions to this jurisdiction are capital murder convictions and appeals from the Idaho Public Utilities Commission and the Idaho Industrial Commission (which administers the state's workers' compensation laws), which must be heard by the Supreme Court.

Judges
The Court of Appeals includes four judges. Cases are heard by three-judge panels.

Succession of seats

References

External links
Guide to Idaho's judicial structure from the Idaho State Judiciary website

Idaho state courts
State appellate courts of the United States
1982 establishments in Idaho
Courts and tribunals established in 1982